Sander Raieste (born 31 March 1999) is an Estonian professional basketball player for Kirolbet Baskonia of the Spanish Liga ACB and the EuroLeague. Standing at 2.04 m (6ft 8 in), he plays at the small forward position.

Professional career
Raieste began playing basketball with Viimsi and Audentes.

On 12 August 2016, Raieste signed a five-year contract with Baskonia. He was loaned to Kalev/Cramo in the 2019-20 season, averaging 5.9 points and 3.3 rebounds per game. Raieste signed a four-year extension with Baskonia on 4 August 2020.

National team career
Raieste made his debut for the Estonian national team on 29 June 2018, in a 2019 FIBA Basketball World Cup qualifier against Great Britain, scoring 5 points in a 65–74 away defeat.

Career statistics

Domestic leagues

References

External links
Sander Raieste at basket.ee
Sander Raieste at fiba.com

1999 births
Living people
BC Kalev/Cramo players
Estonian expatriate basketball people in Spain
Estonian men's basketball players
Korvpalli Meistriliiga players
Liga ACB players
Saski Baskonia players
Small forwards
Basketball players from Tallinn